The Harvester is a 1927 American silent comedy film directed by James Leo Meehan and starring Orville Caldwell, Natalie Kingston and Will Walling. It is an adaptation of the 1911 novel of the same name by Gene Stratton-Porter, which was later remade as a sound film in 1936.

Cast
 Orville Caldwell as David Langston 
 Natalie Kingston as Ruth 
 Will Walling as Henry Jamison 
 Jay Hunt as Dr. Carey 
 Lola Todd as Nurse 
 Edward Hearn as Dr. Harmon 
 Fanny Midgley as Granny Moreland

References

Bibliography
 Munden, Kenneth White. The American Film Institute Catalog of Motion Pictures Produced in the United States, Part 1. University of California Press, 1997.

External links

1927 films
1927 comedy films
Silent American comedy films
Films directed by James Leo Meehan
American silent feature films
1920s English-language films
American black-and-white films
Film Booking Offices of America films
Films based on works by Gene Stratton-Porter
Films based on American novels
1920s American films